UPS Capital is a financial services division of UPS  that offers traditional and non-traditional financial services and insurance products.

History
UPS Capital was created in 1998 as a financial services division within UPS.

UPS Capital at first leveraged an existing UPS product, collect on delivery (C.O.D.), as its core service offering, but the traditional C.O.D. model was improved with financial benefits designed to help accelerate and secure the flow of funds between UPS shippers and their customers. The success of these enhancements led to other financial products and services, including asset-based lending (ABL), equipment leasing, domestic and international factoring, a UPS Capital-branded credit card for small businesses and employees, and electronic bill presentment and payment, which still serve UPS customers today.

Also at this time, UPS Capital began opening offices in the United Kingdom, Taiwan, Hong Kong, and Norway to build an international network that supports customers’ trade finance needs.

CEO
UPS Capital's Chief Executive Officer is Mark Robinson.

Headquarters
UPS Capital is headquartered in Atlanta, Georgia.

Company Services
UPS Capital serves the following industries as of June 2017:

Automotive
Healthcare
High Tech
Industrial Manufacturing
Professional Services
Retail
Cargo Insurance
Economy

Office Locations
These are UPS Capital's office locations.
Austria
Belgium
Brazil
Canada
China
France
Germany
Italy
Japan
Korea
Malaysia
Mexico
Netherlands
Singapore
Spain
Switzerland
Taiwan
Thailand
United Kingdom
United States
Vietnam

See also
 Shipping insurance

Official Website
 UPS Capital website

References

Financial services companies of the United States
Capital
Companies based in Atlanta